Phyllanthus gunnii, the scrubby spurge, is a small plant growing in eastern and southern Australia, often on rocky forest sites near water.

References

Flora of New South Wales
Flora of Tasmania
Flora of Queensland
Flora of Victoria (Australia)
gunnii